Sunshine Square is a department store in Bayan Baru, Penang, Malaysia. Opened in 1993, Sunshine Square is the flagship store of the local retail firm, Suiwah Corporation. The five-storey shopping centre caters to the surrounding community, as well as shoppers from the nearby towns and residential areas such as Bayan Lepas.

The department store off Jalan Mayang Pasir contains a hypermarket, eateries such as McDonald's and Pizza Hut, and function halls for meetings, incentives, conferences and exhibitions (MICE), as well as a food court.

History 
The department store was built by the Penang Development Corporation (PDC), which had been earlier tasked with the development of the township of Bayan Baru. Completed in 1993, Sunshine Square is the flagship store of Suiwah Corporation, a Penang-based retailer with stores throughout the state.

The shopping centre originally contained a cineplex and a bowling alley, although these have since been converted into function halls suitable for meetings, incentives, conferences and exhibitions (MICE). Even so, the consistent upgrading of the department store and its competitive pricing have allowed it to maintain its customer base.

Transport 
Rapid Penang bus routes 302, 303, 304, 305, 306, 307, 308, 401E and CAT Bayan Baru include a stop at Sunshine Square, thus providing several transportation options for shoppers coming from the Penang International Airport or George Town.

See also 
 List of shopping malls in Malaysia

References

External links 
 Suiwah Corporation

1993 establishments in Malaysia
Buildings and structures in Penang
Shopping malls established in 1993
Shopping malls in Penang